Frauenberg is a former municipality in the district of Bruck-Mürzzuschlag in Styria, Austria. Since the 2015 Styria municipal structural reform, it is part of the municipality Sankt Marein im Mürztal.

History
In 1354 a chapel was built on a site then occupied by a statue of the Virgin Mary.   The chapel was replaced in 1489 by a church in the late Gothic style, and this in turn was replaced by a Baroque church in 1769.   Here, in 1775, the famous organ builder Anton Römer installed an organ.

References

Cities and towns in Bruck-Mürzzuschlag District
Fischbach Alps